Perm International Airport  is an international airport located at Bolshoye Savino,  southwest of the city of Perm, Russia. It is the only airport in Perm Krai with scheduled commercial flights, and serves as Perm's main civilian airport, with bus and minibus services operating during the daytime to the city's main bus terminus.

Perm International is a joint civil-military airfield, hosting a small number of Mikoyan MiG-31 (NATO: Foxhound) fighters of the Russian Air Force operated by the 764th Fighter Aviation Regiment which is part of the 21st Composite Aviation Division which is part of the 14th Air and Air Defence Forces Army.

History 

Perm International Airport was first constructed in 1952 as Bolshoye Savino Airport under the personal control of Field Marshal Georgy Zhukov, a national hero in the Soviet Union for his actions as a commander during World War II. Zhukov was later exiled by Joseph Stalin after the war into the Urals to take command of the Ural Military District, constructing the airfield for the Soviet Air Force in the village of Bolshoye Savino, on the outskirts of the city of Perm.

On 1 May 1960, Boris Ajvazyan and Sergei Safronov, two pilots of the 764th Fighter Aviation Regiment involved in the interception of the United States U-2 spy aircraft, were stationed at Bolshoye Savino. During the incident, Safronov was accidentally killed by friendly fire while piloting his MiG-19, which had been scrambled to intercept the U-2 piloted by Gary Powers. A Soviet SAM site fired a salvo of S-75 Dvina missiles at the U-2, downing it, but the strike was mistakenly read to be a miss. Another salvo was fired, however, Safronov was accidentally targeted due to his plane having outdated IFF codes.

In 1965, Bolshoye Savino became the main civilian airport for Perm, replacing the nearby Bakharevka Airport. It was re-purposed as a joint civil-military airport, and began servicing medium-sized airliners with 39 parking spots, a terminal and a cargo area. During the Cold War, the airfield operated up to 38 MiG-25 interceptors, with a number of Yak-25, and Yak-28 aircraft and received modern MiG-31s in 1991. In 2002, the runway was lengthened from 2,500 to 3,200 meters.

Reconstruction and new terminal

Phase 1
In 2012, with increasing traffic and the need for regional flights, the government started making plans for an improvement project that would include a new passenger terminal with an annual capacity of 2 million passengers by 2020, as well as other minor improvements. Further expansion by 2035 was going to include doubling the floor area of the terminal, as well as building multi-level car parks, office space, hotels, a shopping mall and an aircraft hangar. Perm citizens have chosen to retain the name "Bolshoye Savino" for the new terminal.

The new terminal was officially opened on 30 November 2017. International flights are currently served by the old terminal. The first international flights were expected to be launched in March of 2018.

Phase 2
Currently, the boarding on the aircraft is done by apron buses, but jet bridges are planned to be installed. This phase was scheduled to be finished in 2019, but due to heavy rains during spring and summer, there is a delay in construction process.

Airlines and destinations

Accidents
 Aeroflot Flight 821, operated by Aeroflot-Nord in a service agreement with Aeroflot, crashed on approach on 14 September 2008, killing all 88 people on board. One of the pilots was found to be intoxicated by alcohol.

See also

 List of the busiest airports in Russia
 List of the busiest airports in Europe
 List of the busiest airports in the former USSR

References

External links

 NOAA/NWS current weather observations
 ASN Accident history for USPP
  60th Anniversary of the 4th PVO Army - Russian but contains information on airfield history

Russian Air Force bases
Soviet Air Force bases
Airports built in the Soviet Union
Airports in Perm Krai
Novaport
Airports established in 1952
1952 establishments in the Soviet Union
14th Air and Air Defence Forces Army